Żelazny Most Reservoir - the largest sump reservoir of froth (copper mining tailings dam) in Europe, owned by KGHM Polska Miedź. 

The name of the reservoir comes from the nearby village of Żelazny Most, located 3.4 kilometres south-west of the reservoir; with the village of Rudna to the east of the reservoir. 

The reservoir's construction began in 1974, and exploitation (and the completion of the reservoir's construction) on February 12, 1977. The construction of the reservoir included the destruction of the villages of Barszów, Kalinówka, and Pielgrzymów.  

The site is the largest tailings dam in Europe.

References

Lakes of Poland
Lakes of Lower Silesian Voivodeship
1977 establishments in Poland
Tailings dams